Shushila Devi Likmabam (born 1 February 1995) is an Indian judoka who won the silver medal in the women's 48 kg weight class at the judo at the 2014 Commonwealth Games at Glasgow. She hails from Manipur state in India. Likmabam had earlier pinned Chloe Rayner in the semis. She won the silver medal in women's 48 kg judo.

At 2014 Commonwealth Games, she won silver medal in the women's 48 kg judo losing to Kimberley Renicks in the gold medal match.

At 2019 South Asian Games, she won Gold medal in women's 48 Kg weight class.

Likmabam qualified for the 2020 Summer Olympics as the lone representative for India in judo. She competed in the women's 48 kg event and was eliminated in the first round.

At 2022 Commonwealth Games, she won silver medal in the women's 48 kg judo losing to South Africa's Michaela Whitebooi in the gold medal match.

References

External links 

List of Medal winners at Commonwealth Games Glasgow 2014

Living people
Indian female judoka
1995 births
Sportswomen from Manipur
Commonwealth Games silver medallists for India
Indian female martial artists
Commonwealth Games medallists in judo
21st-century Indian women
Martial artists from Manipur
Judoka at the 2020 Summer Olympics
Olympic judoka of India
Judoka at the 2014 Commonwealth Games
Judoka at the 2022 Commonwealth Games
South Asian Games medalists in judo
South Asian Games gold medalists for India
20th-century Indian women
Judoka at the 2014 Asian Games
Recipients of the Arjuna Award
Medallists at the 2014 Commonwealth Games
Medallists at the 2022 Commonwealth Games